Steinfurther Allee is a through station on the Hamburg U-Bahn line U2. The underground rapid transit station was opened in 1990 and is located in the Hamburg suburb of Billstedt, Germany. Billstedt is part of the borough of Hamburg-Mitte.

History 
As with the neighboring Mümmelmannsberg station, Steinfurther Allee station was built between 1987 and 1990. The station was designed by Hamburg architects Kahl + Hoyer. In case of need for civil protection, the station can house up to 1,200 people.

Layout 
Steinfurther Allee is a minor street off Möllner Landstraße. The actual station is located east of a Park + Ride parkhouse, which sits between station and the name-giving street. On surface, Steinfurther Allee station accommodates a regional bus station. Below ground, the station's rail tracks and platforms are slightly offset to the layout on surface. The two side platforms have one centrally located exit with stairs, escalators and one elevator each.

Service

Trains 
Steinfurther Allee U-Bahn station is served by Hamburg U-Bahn line U2; departures are every 10 minutes.

Bus 
Steinfurther Allee bus terminal is served by a number of bus operators to connect with neighboring suburbs and municipalities.

Gallery

See also 

 List of Hamburg U-Bahn stations

References

External links 

 Line and route network plans by hvv.de 
 100 Jahre Hochbahn by hochbahn.de 

Hamburg U-Bahn stations in Hamburg
U2 (Hamburg U-Bahn) stations
Buildings and structures in Hamburg-Mitte
Railway stations in Germany opened in 1990
1990 establishments in West Germany